Chesterton Range is a national park in South West Queensland, Australia, 585 km west of Brisbane. It is located north east of Morven in both the locality of Redford in the Maranoa Region and in Tyrconnel in the Shire of Murweh.  It lies in the water catchment areas of three waterways.  These are the Warrego River, Wallam Creek and the Maranoa River.  The park protects part of Brigalow Belt South bioregion.  To the north and to the west of the park is Orkadilla State Forest. The average elevation of the terrain is 544 meters.

The park features a small two-room homestead.  The pastoral holding was abandoned in 1937.  13 rare or threatened species have been identified in the national park.  This includes a colony of the vulnerable yakka skink, then woma python, red goshawk, grey falcon, koala and others.

See also
 Protected areas of Queensland

References

National parks of Queensland
Protected areas established in 1992
South West Queensland
1992 establishments in Australia